Crambidia cephalica, the yellow-headed lichen moth, is a moth of the family Erebidae. It was described by Augustus Radcliffe Grote and Coleman Townsend Robinson in 1870. It is found in the central and southern part of the United States, from eastern Nevada, Utah and Arizona to southern Ohio, Tennessee, North Carolina and northern Georgia. The habitat consists of steppes and open forests.

The length of the forewings is 9–15 mm. The forewings are white without markings. The hindwings are yellow off white. Adults are on wing from March to September in multiple generations per year.

The larvae probably feed on lichens and algae.

References

Lithosiina
Moths described in 1870
Moths of North America